Football Club Svoboda is a Bulgarian football club, based in Peshtera. The club currently plays in the South-West Third League.

Current squad

League positions

Svoboda Peshtera